In Greek mythology, Clonie (Ancient Greek: Κλονίη) was the 'fair as a goddess' Amazon. She came with their queen, Penthesilia to the Trojan War.

Mythology 
During the siege of Troy, Clonie killed the Achaean warrior Menippus and in turn died at the hands of the latter's comrade, Podarces."... and Clonie [slayed] Menippus, him who sailed long since from Phylace, led by his lord Protesilaus to the war with Troy. Then was Podarces, son of Iphiclus, heart-wrung with ruth and wrath to see him lie dead, of all battle-comrades best-beloved. Swiftly at Clonie he hurled, the maid fair as a Goddess: plunged the unswerving lance 'twixt hip and hip, and rushed the dark blood forth after the spear, and all her bowels gushed out."

Notes

References 

 Quintus Smyrnaeus, The Fall of Troy translated by Way. A. S. Loeb Classical Library Volume 19. London: William Heinemann, 1913. Online version at theio.com
 Quintus Smyrnaeus, The Fall of Troy. Arthur S. Way. London: William Heinemann; New York: G.P. Putnam's Sons. 1913. Greek text available at the Perseus Digital Library.

Amazons of the Trojan war